The Alexander State Forest Headquarters Building served as the headquarters of the Alexander State Forest in Woodworth, Louisiana. The building, a log cabin, was constructed in 1935 by the Civilian Conservation Corps, who had established a camp in the forest in 1923. Alexander State Forest, which was established in 1923 and continued to grow until 1938, was the first state forest in Louisiana and marked the first effort by a Southern state to preserve its yellow pine forests. The headquarters building is the only remaining structure from the forest's early years and is the main physical remnant of Louisiana's conservation efforts in the early 20th century. This log building was moved to the Southern Forest Heritage Museum at Longleaf, Louisiana in September 2014 to host a Civilian Conservation Corps museum.

The building was added to the National Register of Historic Places on May 21, 1987.

References

Government buildings on the National Register of Historic Places in Louisiana
Buildings and structures in Rapides Parish, Louisiana
Civilian Conservation Corps in Louisiana
Log cabins in the United States
National Register of Historic Places in Rapides Parish, Louisiana
Log buildings and structures on the National Register of Historic Places in Louisiana